The 1966 Colorado State Rams football team represented Colorado State University as an independent during the 1966 NCAA University Division football season. In their fifth season under head coach Mike Lude, the Rams compiled a 7–3 record.

Schedule

References

Colorado State
Colorado State Rams football seasons
Colorado State Rams football